Adjengere is a town in the Sotouboua Prefecture of Centrale Region, Togo.

Populated places in Centrale Region, Togo